Tiago Vieira Pinto Carneiro (born 12 August 1983 in Braga) is a Portuguese footballer who played as a midfielder.

References

External links

1983 births
Living people
Sportspeople from Braga
Portuguese footballers
Association football midfielders
Primeira Liga players
Liga Portugal 2 players
Segunda Divisão players
G.D. Joane players
Rio Ave F.C. players
F.C. Marco players
F.C. Maia players
Merelinense F.C. players
Louletano D.C. players
Varzim S.C. players
Moreirense F.C. players
C.D. Tondela players
F.C. Felgueiras 1932 players
Vilaverdense F.C. players
Clube Caçadores das Taipas players
G.D.R.C. Os Sandinenses players
Cypriot First Division players
Cypriot Second Division players
Olympiakos Nicosia players
APOP Kinyras FC players
Portuguese expatriate footballers
Expatriate footballers in Cyprus
Portuguese expatriate sportspeople in Cyprus